Calinaga sudassana is a species of butterfly in the family Nymphalidae. It is found in Burma and Thailand.

Subspecies
Calinaga sudassana sudassana
Calinaga sudassana distans Monastyrskii et Devyatkin, 2000

References

Butterflies described in 1893
Calinaginae
Butterflies of Indochina